A null session is an anonymous connection to an inter-process communication network service on Windows-based computers. The service is designed to allow named pipe connections but may be used by attackers to remotely gather information about the system.

Exposure

References

Hacking (computer security)
Computer security exploits